Meridemis punjabensis is a species of moth of the family Tortricidae. It is found in north-western India.

References

	

Moths described in 2004
Archipini